The Ndogo are an ethnic group from the South Sudan, part of the Fertit.

They have an estimated population of 40,000, scattered around Wau, Raga and Deim Zubier.

References 

Ethnic groups in South Sudan